The N's Student Body is an eight-episode competition series that first aired on The N on July 11, 2008. The contestants were twelve students from two high schools in Illinois: MacArthur and Eisenhower. The series was first announced on November 6, 2007.

Tagline: Competition is tough. Change is tougher.

Overview 

Host Laila Ali challenges twelve out-of-shape and overweight students from rival high schools to change their bodies, their nutrition, and their attitudes. The winning school takes home $25,000. Whoever loses the most weight wins $25,000 for themselves. The rules changed at the end of the competition, as the grand prize was awarded for "biggest overall transformation".  The solo win went to Mike Walker for his overall change in attitude and self-esteem The Team Win was MacArthur.

Every week, the two schools compete in some sort of challenge. The school that wins the challenge gets a reward, such as a yacht ride or being served dinner by the other team. The losing team gets "punishment", like husking corn or cleaning the bleachers after a high school football game. The two trainers for the teen students were Eric Carlson and Sam Upton.

Weigh-Ins & Evaluations 

After the challenge and reward/punishment, the schools go to the weigh in to find out what their current weight is, therefore evaluating how much weight has been lost that week. Later, the teams go to an evaluation where they are given 1 of 3 different rankings:

Green: the student is making good progress.

Yellow: the student is not making progress (3 yellows equal a Red)

Red: the student isn't invested in the competition and is asked to leave.

Results

 The student was from MacArthur.
 The student was from Eisenhower
 (SOLO WIN) The Student made the biggest overall transformation.
 (TEAM WIN) The team won the game.
 (MVP) In the event of a tie a student was chosen as an MVP and won for the team.
 (Safe) The student got a green card and was improving.
 (Warn) The student received a yellow card and a warning.
 (Elim) The student was asked to leave because of their lack of being in the game.
 The student was not in the competition that week.

* In week 3, Josh joined Eisenhower in the competition to even out the teams.

** In week 7, Wayne's evaluation did not count to even out the teams.

*** In week 8, Bronson won the bet with his mother by losing 74 pounds, reaching a final weight of 206 pounds. Although Bronson lost the most weight and became the most fit, Mike won the grand prize for his change in attitude and self-esteem.

References

External links 
 

2000s American reality television series
2000s American teen television series
2008 American television series debuts
2008 American television series endings
English-language television shows
Fitness reality television series
The N original programming
Television series about teenagers
Television shows set in Illinois
Television shows filmed in Illinois
Decatur, Illinois